Alvin Journeyman (1995) is an alternate history/fantasy novel by American writer  Orson Scott Card. It is the fourth book in Card's The Tales of Alvin Maker series and is about Alvin Miller, the Seventh son of a seventh son. Alvin Journeyman won the Locus Award for Best Fantasy Novel in 1996.

Synopsis
Alvin is a Maker, and what he can make is a new future for America. But to do that he must defeat his ancient enemy, the Unmaker, whose cruel whispers and deadly plots have threatened Alvin's life at every turn.

Now a grown man and a journeyman smith, Alvin has returned to his family and friends in the town of Vigor Church, to share in their isolation, to work as a blacksmith, and to try to teach anyone who will learn the knack of being a Maker. For Alvin has had a vision of the city he will build, and he knows that he cannot build it alone.

But the Unmaker is not through with Alvin. If that spirit of destruction cannot stop him by magic, or war and devastation, then it will try to crush the young Maker by simpler means - more human means. By lies and innuendo, and by false accusations, Alvin is driven from his home back to Hatrack River, only to find that the Unmaker has been there before him, and that he must now stand trial for his life. Against him in this trial stands Daniel Webster.

Meanwhile, his brother Calvin has started to grow into his own knacks, which he views to be equal to Alvin's. When Alvin returned to Vigor Church he found that Calvin had been doing all the jobs that Alvin had done prior to his apprenticeship. When Alvin started to teach how to be a maker, Calvin resented the way he felt he was being treated and decided to learn how to be a Maker on his own, but by any means he deems necessary. He finds passage to the United Kingdom, and then to the courtship of Emperor Napoleon himself in Paris, to treat him for his gout. By healing the pain each day, he spends a few hours a day learning from Napoleon on how to rule. Calvin makes a friend in Paris, with whom he then leaves Napoleon (healed from ever feeling pain again) and heads to America.

References to other works
The song Alvin made up during his stay in Hatrack River jail contains a reference to Tolkien's  The Lord of the Rings  trilogy.

See also

 List of works by Orson Scott Card

References

External links

 About the novel Alvin Journeyman from Card's website
 Alvin Journeyman at Worlds Without End

1995 American novels
The Tales of Alvin Maker series novels
American fantasy novels
American alternate history novels
1995 fantasy novels
Tor Books books